Standard American English may refer to:

 American English, the set of varieties of English spoken in the United States
 General American English, the majority accent in the United States